The Elephant Building or Chang Building is a high-rise building at Paholyothin Road and Ratchadaphisek Road in Bangkok, Thailand. It lies in the north Bangkok business district and Chatuchak District. The building is one of the better known buildings in Bangkok as it resembles an elephant. It was a collaboration between Dr Arun Chaisaree and architect Ong-ard Satrabhandhu The building has 32 floors and is 102 metres (335 ft) high. It was completed in 1997. The Elephant Building was ranked number four of the "20 World's Iconic Skyscrapers [sic]" by CNNGo in February 2011.

The elephant building consists of seven parts:

 Tower A (offices)
 Tower B (offices)
 Tower C (residential)
 Top Floor (residential suites)
 Recreation Ground (swimming pool, gardens)
 Shopping plaza, bank, post office
 Garage

Nearby
Opposite lies Major Cineplex Ratchayothin. Further down the road is Lotus's, and Central Lardprao.

Transportation 
 BTS Skytrain – Pahonyothin 24 Station

References

External links 
 Official site
 Building information at Emporis

Skyscrapers in Bangkok
Chatuchak district
Buildings and structures completed in 1997
1997 establishments in Thailand
Skyscraper office buildings in Thailand
Residential skyscrapers in Thailand